Haygood is a surname. Notable people with the surname include:

Atticus Greene Haygood (1839–1896), American clergyman
Dixie Haygood (1861–1915), American stage magician
Herb Haygood (born 1977), American professional football player
Wil Haygood (born 1954), American journalist, author of "A Butler Well Served by this Election", the basis for the film The Butler

See also
Carpenter–Haygood Stadium, American football stadium in Arkadelphia, Arkansas
Joseph Haygood Blodgett (1858–1934), American architect and contractor